Benjamin Halloran (born 14 June 1992) is an Australian football player who plays as a winger for A-League Men club Adelaide United.

Club career

Gold Coast United
Halloran made his debut for Gold Coast United as a substitute in their Round 4, 1–0 loss to Melbourne Victory in the 2010–11 season.

On 6 January 2011, Gold Coast United coach Miron Bleiberg addressed the speculation that the talented player may leave the club however Bleiberg was adamant that the player was contracted for another two years and unless a sizable transfer offer was made the player would remain at Gold Coast.

In the 2010–11 A-League season, Halloran started two games and came on as substitute twice. The next season Halloran established himself as a future Socceroos player. He had a stand out season for Gold Coast. He played 17 games and scored four goals. Halloran had a great game against Adelaide United, where he scored one goal and received the match ball for a best on ground performance.

Brisbane Roar
Following the demise of Gold Coast United at the end of the 2011–12 season, Halloran attracted a lot of interest from Melbourne Victory, Brisbane Roar and "at least three other A-League clubs" for his services for the 2012–13 season. On 13 May 2012, it was announced that Brisbane had signed Halloran on a three-year deal with the 2011–12 Champions. In Halloran 's seventh match for the roar he would score his first goal against Sydney FC. Halloran would have a quieter year than the one before but played more matches.

Halloran started 18 matches but was forced to come on as the substitute 10 times. Halloran scored four goals in his time at Roar including the winning goal in the 83rd minute against Adelaide United. After the match his Manager, Mike Mulvey said "Ben needs to be more of a team player", which Halloran understood.

Fortuna Düsseldorf

On 22 May 2013, It was announced that Halloran had requested a move to Fortuna Düsseldorf (German 2. Bundesliga), a request that was approved by Brisbane Roar. The transfer amount was said to be around $400,000. On 7 October 2013, Halloran made his debut for Fortuna Düsseldorf against Greuther Fürth. Ben would play the entire match on the right wing in the 2–1 win. Halloran scored his first goal for Düsseldorf's first team in his sixth appearance, and in the 70th minute, with the goal equalizing the score and snatching a point for his team.

1. FC Heidenheim
On 23 June 2015, it was confirmed that Halloran had left Dusseldorf for fellow 2. Bundesliga side, 1. FC Heidenheim on a 3-year deal.

On 26 July 2015, Halloran made his debut as a substitute against 1860 Munich in a 1–0 win.

V-Varen Nagasaki
In January 2018, Halloran ended his spell in Europe and signed for V-Varen Nagasaki. After making five appearances for the club, Halloran left the club in on 3 July 2018.

Adelaide United
On 14 August 2018, Halloran returned to the A-League signing a 2 year deal for Adelaide United. In his first season at the club, Halloran scored the winning goal in the elimination final against Melbourne City in the 119th minute, sending the Reds through. In his second season at the club, Halloran scored 9 goals in the league, and 3 goals in the cup. In what was prolific season for Halloran, he had a lot of interest from rival clubs, however, despite interest, Halloran signed a 2 year contract extension on 4 March 2020.

FC Seoul
On 10 January 2022, FC Seoul announced that Ben Halloran had a signed for an undisclosed fee on a two-year contract until 2023.

On 23 June 2022, FC Seoul announced that Halloran's contract was officially terminated by mutual consent.

International career
Halloran made six appearances for Australia's U-20 side scoring one goal. He was selected in the squad for Australia's East Asia Cup Qualifiers, but was not picked for the team.

Halloran was selected in Australia's provisional 30 man squad for the 2014 FIFA World Cup. He made his international debut in a pre World Cup friendly match against South Africa on 26 May 2014. He made his World Cup debut on 13 June 2014, coming in as a substitute as Australia lost 1–3 to Chile.

Career statistics

Honours

Club
Gold Coast United
 National Youth League Championship: 2009–10

Adelaide United
 FFA Cup: 2018, 2019

International
Australia
 AFF U-19 Youth Championship: 2010

References

External links

1992 births
Living people
Gold Coast United FC players
Australian soccer players
A-League Men players
Brisbane Roar FC players
Fortuna Düsseldorf players
FC Seoul players
People educated at Brisbane State High School
2. Bundesliga players
K League 1 players
Australia under-20 international soccer players
Australia international soccer players
2014 FIFA World Cup players
Sportspeople from Cairns
Association football wingers
Australian expatriate soccer players
Australian expatriate sportspeople in Japan
Australian expatriate sportspeople in Germany
Australian expatriate sportspeople in South Korea
Fortuna Düsseldorf II players
Regionalliga players
Expatriate footballers in South Korea
Expatriate footballers in Japan
Expatriate footballers in Germany
Soccer players from Queensland